Mršić is a Serbo-Croatian surname, derived from the personal characteristic of being "thin, skinny" (mršav). It may refer to:

Antonio Mršić (born 1987), Croatian footballer
Ivan Mršić (born 1949), Croatian and North American retired footballer
Stanko Mršić (born 1955),  Serbian football manager and a former player
Dragomir Mršić (born 1969), Swedish actor (original serbian)
Damir Mršić (born 1970) Serbian-born Turkish professional basketball player
Veljko Mršić (born 1971), retired Croatian (Serbian nationality) basketball player and currently a basketball coach
Simon  Mršić (born 1991), American and Bosnian soccer player
Zvonimir Mršić (born 1966), Croatian politician

See also
Mršići, Serbian village in Republika Srpska (Bosnia)
Mršević, surname
Mrsić, surname

Croatian surnames
Serbian surnames